Cappy is a commune in the Somme department in Hauts-de-France in northern France.

Geography 

History 
 Two Roman villas have been found within the boundaries of the commune.
 Known as "Capiacum" in 887, from the earlier name "Caput Loci" which suggests a fortress was built to defend the passage of the Somme.
 In the 10th century, the village had a priory.  Robert I of Péronne was the seigneur.
 In 1260, Cappy was one of 25 Picardie towns to receive its charter from Louis IX.
 In 1373, The priory, the village and the château were destroyed by the Earl of Warwick.
 The village was also pillaged during the wars with Spain.

Population

Monuments 
 Saint-Nicolas church, built in the lower village. The tower dates from 1654. Partially rebuilt in 1920, after the battles of 1916.
 The railway museum 'Chemin de fer Froissy-Dompierre'.

See also 
 Froissy Dompierre Light Railway
 Communes of the Somme department

References

External links 

 Cappy historical website 

Communes of Somme (department)